Mofo Gasy, translated as "Malagasy bread", is a Malagasy traditional recipe typically eaten as a breakfast. It consists mainly of rice flour and sugar fried within a specific mold. Mofo gasy can also be made with coconut milk. Variations of the recipe occur based on the regions of Madagascar.

References

Malagasy cuisine
Fried foods
Rice cakes